Twin Infinitives is the second studio album by Royal Trux. It was released as a double LP in 1990 by Drag City, then reissued on CD and cassette in 1994. Twin Infinitives is the first full-length album released under Chicago independent label Drag City.

Twin Infinitives is noted for its deconstructed arrangements, unorthodox vocals and dense production; all were extremes rarely visited to the same degrees on Royal Trux's later releases.

Track listing

Personnel 
Credits adapted from liner notes.
 Neil Hagerty – vocals, guitar, percussion, production
 Jennifer Herrema – vocals, organ, percussion, production
 Greg Freeman – engineering

References

External links 
 

1990 albums
Royal Trux albums
Drag City (record label) albums
Domino Recording Company albums